Pictures with Woofer, originally titled Patty's Picture House, is a Canadian children's short film television series which aired on CBC Television in 1960.

Premise
Patty (Donna Miller) and her dog Woofer (a puppet) introduced short films produced by the CBC and by The Walt Disney Company.

Scheduling
This half-hour series was broadcast on Fridays at 4:30 p.m. (Eastern) from 8 January to 24 June 1960. Patty's Picture House was retitled Pictures With Woofer effective with the 19 February 1960 episode.

References

External links
 

CBC Television original programming
1960 Canadian television series debuts
1960 Canadian television series endings